Arnold may refer to:

People
 Arnold (given name), a masculine given name
 Arnold (surname), a German and English surname

Places

Australia 
 Arnold, Victoria, a small town in the Australian state of Victoria

Canada
 Arnold, Nova Scotia

United Kingdom
 Arnold, East Riding of Yorkshire
 Arnold, Nottinghamshire

United States
 Arnold, California, in Calaveras County
 Arnold, Carroll County, Illinois
 Arnold, Morgan County, Illinois
 Arnold, Iowa
 Arnold, Kansas
 Arnold, Maryland
 Arnold, Mendocino County, California
 Arnold, Michigan
 Arnold, Minnesota
 Arnold, Missouri
 Arnold, Nebraska
 Arnold, Ohio
 Arnold, Pennsylvania
 Arnold, Texas
 Arnold, Brooke County, West Virginia
 Arnold, Lewis County, West Virginia
 Arnold, Wisconsin
 Arnold Arboretum of Harvard University, Massachusetts
 Arnold Township, Custer County, Nebraska

Other uses 
 Arnold (automobile), a short-lived English car
 Arnold of Manchester, a former English coachbuilder
 Arnold (band), an English indie band
 Arnold (comic strip), a comic strip from the mid-1980s
 Arnold (crater), crater on the Moon
 Arnold (film), a 1973 American comedy horror film
 Arnold (Hey Arnold!), the main character of the Nickelodeon animated television series Hey Arnold!
 Arnold (models), a toy and model railway company
 Arnold (software), 3D rendering software
 Arnold Worldwide, an American advertising agency
 Arnold Town F.C., an English football team
 Edward Arnold (publisher), a British publishing house with its head office in London, founded in 1890

See also
 Arnaud (disambiguation), French equivalent given name
 Arnie (disambiguation)
 Justice Arnold (disambiguation)